James Erwin is an American author. He has written several works of history and science fiction. He came to public notice by creating Rome Sweet Rome, a short story on Reddit which went viral and became the basis of a Warner Brothers screenplay.

Personal life
Erwin was born in Cedar Rapids, Iowa. He attended the University of Iowa. He currently lives in Des Moines, Iowa. In 2009, Erwin was a two-time Jeopardy! champion.

As an author
Erwin's first book, a historical encyclopedia about secessionist movements in the United States titled Declarations of Independence, was published in 2007. He worked as a technical writer. He wrote a second historical encyclopedia in 2010 but it was never published due to the sale of the publisher, Facts on File.

He came to public notice when he created the story Rome Sweet Rome, under the alias Prufrock451, in response to a question on Reddit. The story quickly went viral. Featured in national media, the story came to the attention of producer Gianni Nunnari, as well as the motion picture studio Warner Brothers. Warner Brothers bought a screenplay based on the short story, and Erwin became the subject of profiles and interviews in Wired Magazine, Time, FT, Popular Mechanics, and other media.
 
Rome Sweet Rome remains popular; it was later revealed that Apollo 18 screenwriter Brian Miller had been hired by Warner Brothers to write a second draft of the screenplay.

Erwin parlayed his success into a Kickstarter campaign for his first novel Acadia.

Aside from his fiction and full-length works, Erwin has contributed articles to over a dozen other historical encyclopedias. He is also a freelance writer for outlets like Wired, Mental Floss, Boing Boing, and Slate.com.

Bibliography

Novels
 (2014) Acadia,

Nonfiction
 (2007) Declarations of Independence: Encyclopedia of American Autonomous and Secessionist Movements, 
 (2012) Facts on File Encyclopedia of U.S. Military Actions,

Short Stories
 (2011) Rome Sweet Rome
 (2013) Rising Sun, in Europa Universalis IV: What If? the Anthology of Alternate History, 
 (2014) The Khan, the Caliph, and the King, in Crusader Kings II: Tales of Treachery,

Screenplays
 (2012) Rome Sweet Rome

References

External links
 
 
 

Date of birth missing (living people)
Living people
Writers from Iowa
People from Cedar Rapids, Iowa
Jeopardy! contestants
Writers from Des Moines, Iowa
University of Iowa alumni
American science fiction writers
Year of birth missing (living people)